is a passenger railway station on the Keihin-Tohoku Line in Urawa-ku, Saitama, Saitama Prefecture, Japan, operated by East Japan Railway Company (JR East).

Lines
Kita-Urawa Station is served by the Keihin-Tōhoku Line.

Layout
The station has one island platform serving two tracks, connected by a footbridge to the elevated station building. The station has a Midori no Madoguchi staffed ticket office.

Platforms

History 
The station opened on 1 September 1936. The station became part of the JR East network after JNR privatization on 1 April 1987.

Passenger statistics 
In fiscal 2019, the station was used by an average of 52,674 passengers daily (boarding passengers only).

Surrounding area 
 Saitama Museum of Modern Art
 Kita-Urawa Park

Bus terminal
Kita-Urawa Bus Terminal is a seven-minute walk east of the station.

Kita-Urawa Bus Terminal

See also 
List of railway stations in Japan

References

External links

JR East station information 

Railway stations in Saitama Prefecture
Keihin-Tōhoku Line
Railway stations in Saitama (city)
Railway stations in Japan opened in 1936